Ike Sturm (born 29 June 1978 in Wisconsin) is a bassist, composer, and bandleader in New York. He serves as Music Director for the Jazz Ministry at Saint Peter's Church in Manhattan.

Biography 
Raised in a musical home in Wisconsin, Sturm learned from his father, composer and arranger Fred Sturm. He received degrees from the Eastman School of Music and has performed with Gene Bertoncini, Donny McCaslin, Bobby McFerrin, Ben Monder, Ingrid Jensen, Steve Lehman, Maria Schneider, Kenny Wheeler and many others. He has played on four Down Beat award-winning recordings as well as Steve Reich's albums for  Cantaloupe Music and Nonesuch Records. He has appeared with the International Contemporary Ensemble, Signal and Alarm Will Sound.

Commissioned by Saint Peter's Church, he composed Jazz Mass as a large-scale work featuring choir, string orchestra, and saxophonist Donny McCaslin. The recording received 4 1/2 stars rating and was named among the Best of 2010 in Down Beat magazine. Jazz Mass premiered in Europe in 2011 at the Gedächtniskirche in Berlin.

Discography

Solo albums 
2004: Spirit (Ike Sturm)
2009: Jazzmass (CD Baby)

Collaborations 
With Steve Reich
2002: Tehillim / The Desert Music (Cantaloupe)

With Ted Poor Quartet
2004: All Around (Trier)

With Kira Fontana
2007: The Inner Revolution (Spark the Fire)

With Alan Ferber
20110: Music for Nonet and Strings / Chamber Songs (Sunnyside)

With Jostein Gulbrandsen Trio
2011: Release of Tension (CD Baby)

With J.J. Wright
2014: Inward Looking Outward (Ropeadope)

References

External links 
 
 Ike Sturm "Stillness" on YouTube

1978 births
Living people
American jazz composers
American jazz double-bassists
Male double-bassists
Eastman School of Music alumni
21st-century double-bassists
American male jazz composers
21st-century American male musicians
9 Horses members